James Musoni is the current Ambassador of the Republic of Rwanda to the Republic of Zimbabwe.

Career
In his career, James Musoni has served in the following offices:

Minister of Infrastructure (2014-2018);
Minister of Local Government (2009-2014)
Minister of Finance and Economic Planning (2006-2009)
Minister of Commerce, Industry, Investment Promotion, Tourism and Cooperatives (2005-2006)
Minister of State in charge of Investment promotion and Industries.(2005)
Commissioner General of Rwanda Revenue Authority (2001-2005)
Deputy commissioner General of Rwanda Revenue Authority (2000)
Director of Youth Affairs, Ministry of Youth, Sports and Culture (1994-2000)
A member of Presidential Advisory Council (PAC) (2008-2018)

He has been part of the team that spearheaded and guided a number of reforms in Rwanda that have contributed to the country’s good performance in socio-economic and political transformation.

References

Living people
Year of birth missing (living people)
Rwandan civil servants
Members of the Parliament of Rwanda
Finance ministers of Rwanda
Industry ministers of Rwanda
Infrastructure ministers of Rwanda
Trade ministers of Rwanda
Makerere University alumni
Newport International University alumni
Harvard Kennedy School alumni